HD 44131 is a star in the equatorial constellation of Orion, positioned near the eastern constellation border with Monoceros. It has a reddish hue and is faintly visible to the naked eye with an apparent visual magnitude of 4.91. The star is located at a distance of approximately 465 light years from the Sun based on parallax, and it is drifting further away with a radial velocity of +48.6 km/s. However, these velocity variations may be due to other causes.

This is an aging red giant star currently on the asymptotic giant branch with a stellar classification of M1III. With the supply of core hydrogen exhausted, this star has cooled and expanded off the main sequence. It is now estimated to have 56 times the radius of the Sun and is radiating 673 times the Sun's luminosity from its swollen photosphere at an effective temperature of 3,932 K. This is a periodic variable of unknown type with a frequency of 0.11212 cycles per day (period of 8.9 days) and an amplitude of 0.0106 in magnitude.

References

M-type giants
Asymptotic-giant-branch stars
Spectroscopic binaries
Suspected variables

Orion (constellation)
BD-02 1564
044131
030093
2275